Hew is a masculine given name. Notable people with the name include:

 Hew Ainslie (1792–1878), Scottish poet
 Hew Dalrymple, Lord North Berwick (1652–1737), Scottish judge and politician
 Sir Hew Dalrymple, 2nd Baronet (1712-1790), Scottish politician, grandson of the above
 Hew Dalrymple (advocate) (c. 1740–1774), Scottish advocate, poet and Attorney-General of Grenada
 Sir Hew Dalrymple, 3rd Baronet (1746–1800), Scottish politician, son of the 2nd Baronet
 Sir Hew Dalrymple, 1st Baronet, of High Mark (1750–1830), British Army general
 Hew Hamilton Dalrymple (1857–1945), Scottish politician
 Hew Dalrymple Fanshawe (1860-1957), British Army First World War general
 Hew Fraser (1877-1938), British field hockey player and politician
 Hew Raymond Griffiths (born 1962), a ring leader of DrinkOrDie or DOD, an underground software piracy network
 Sir Hew Dalrymple-Hamilton, 4th Baronet (1774–1834), British politician
 Sir Hew Hamilton-Dalrymple, 10th Baronet (born 1926), retired British officer and former Lord Lieutenant of East Lothian
 Hew Locke (born 1959), British-Guyanese sculptor and visual artist
 Hew Lorimer (1907–1993), Scottish sculptor
 Hew Pike (born 1943), retired British Army lieutenant-general
 Hew Dalrymple Ross (1779–1868), British Army field marshal
 Hew Scott (1791–1872), minister of the Church of Scotland
 Hew Strachan (born 1949), Scottish military historian

See also
 Hewes (disambiguation)
 Hugh (given name)
Hews (disambiguation)

Masculine given names